Shahin Lian Shahrdari Bushehr Football Club (Bashgah-e Futbal-e Shahin Shiherdari-ye Bushiher) is an Iranian football club based in Bushehr, Iran. They are one of the most historical football clubs in Iran and hold home games at Shahid Beheshti Stadium.

History

Shahin F.C. (1942–1967)
Shahin F.C. was established in 1942 by Dr Abbas Ekrami, a teacher.

Ekrami founded the club with help of some young students under the motto

Shahin produced many talented players  like Parviz Dehdari, Masoud Boroumand, Homayoun Behzadi, Jafar Kashani, Hossein Kalani, Hamid Shirzadegan, and many more that played for Team Melli. These talents made Shahin popular in the 1960s but its very popularity was viewed as a threat by the Iran Football Federation and the Keihan Varzeshi newspaper (Iran's most important sports publication at the time).
The conflict between them became worse and on July 9, 1967, two days after Shahin's 3–0 win against Tehranjavan F.C., the Iran Sports Organization declared Shahin F.C. as dissolved. League attendance dropped and other clubs including Pas, Rah Ahan, and Oghab tried to sign Shahin players.

Establishment
Shahin Bushehr was established in 1958 with the name of Khalije Bushehr.

After years of history and competing in different levels of the Iranian football league system, including a 1994–95 appearance in the top division and several years in the second level, Shahin Bushehr was renamed Shahin Pars Jonoubi Bushehr in 2007 and promoted to IPL in 2009. The club is now owned by Pars Special Economic Energy Zone, based in Asalouyeh, Bushehr Province.

Promotion to the Iran Pro League
The club achieved promotion to the Iran Pro League after a 3–2 aggregate playoff victory against Tabriz's Shahrari Tabriz, joining Tractor Sazi in the 2009–2010 edition of the Iran Pro League. In the 2009–2010 season, Shahin Bushehr set a new record in the top flight: they did not get any red cards in their matches.

Relegation
In the 2011–12 season, the Shahin were finalists in the Hazfi Cup but lost to Esteghlal, in the same season the team was relegated to the Azadegan League. Shahin's downward trend continued the following year as they were relegated to the 2nd Division. They again were relegated in 2014, this time to the 3rd Division.

Municipality Takeover
Following a take over by the municipality in the summer of 2015, the club was renamed to Shahin Shahrdari Bushehr and bought the rights of Bahman Shiraz in the 2nd Division. After this takeover Shahin became one of the favourites to be promoted to the Azadegan League. Shahin started the 2015–16 well and advanced to the final group phase, however Shahin finished fourth in Group A and missed out on promotion by four points.

Colours and crest
The common home kit includes a white shirt, black shorts, and white socks. Red and Yellow colours are also seen in the kit. The away kit of the club is commonly with a red background.

Stadium and facilities

The club currently plays its home games at Bushehr's Shahid Beheshti Stadium with a 15,000 capacity.

Former players

Players
As of July 29, 2020

Club managers

 * = Caretaker

Club chairmen
 Alireza Nemati
 Mohammad Dameshghi
 Hossein Bastin
 Vahid Vaezi

Season-by-season
The table below chronicles the achievements of Shahin Bushehr in various competitions since 1993.

References

External links
Official website

 

 
Football clubs in Iran
1942 establishments in Iran